Ogura (written: 小倉 lit. "small storehouse") is a Japanese surname. Notable people with the surname include:

, Japanese shogi player
 Hisayoshi Ogura, member of Taito Corporation's "house band" Zuntata
 Kei Ogura (小椋佳), Japanese singer, songwriter and composer
 Masatsune Ogura (小倉 正恆), Japanese politician and businessman
 Ogura Yonesuke Itoh, Japanese-American artist
 Roh Ogura (小倉 朗), a Japanese composer and writer
, Japanese long jumper
, Japanese linguist
 Shōhei Ogura (小椋 祥平), Japanese footballer
 Takafumi Ogura (小倉 隆史), Japanese footballer
, Japanese cyclist
 Yuki Ogura (小倉遊亀), nihonga painter in Showa period Japan
 Yui Ogura (小倉唯), Japanese voice actress and singer
 Yuko Ogura (小倉優子), Japanese model and singer

Japanese-language surnames